Thomas Fleming Bergin (n/a - 1862) was an Irish civil engineer and early Irish railway official. He was the Company Clerk of the Dublin and Kingstown Railway (D&KR), the first public railway in Ireland. He was also responsible for the design of the Bergin Patent Spring Buffer, the buffering system that it used.

Biography 
Bergin, who was by profession a civil engineer, was to join the Dublin and Kingstown Railway (D&KR) in 1832, replacing James Pim as company secretary. Lyons notes Pim and Bergin as "two of the most valuable engines the D&KR possessed, although other individuals also played an important part."  Murray notes Bergin was to have a "large part of the daily management of the railway", and also notes the Bergin and Pim made an excellent team. Bergin was to remain loyal to the D&KR despite offers from other railways.

Thomas notes the D&KR Chief Clerk (aka Bergin) was sent to the Liverpool and Manchester Railway (L&MR) in June 1833.  Dawson notes Bergin observed the sprung buffer / connection system used on the L&MR and determined to develop his own design for the D&KR.

Bergin was additionally appointed 'Mechanical Engineer in 1835, though as that position was found to be needing a full time appointment Bergin was to revert to Clerk. Bergin retired when the operation of the D&KR was taken over by the Dublin and Wicklow Railway in 1856. 

Bergin served as president of the Microscopical Society of Ireland in 1842. He died in December 1862.

References
 Notes 

 Footnotes 

Sources
 Baker, Richard, and Denis Gill. "Men, microscopes and meetings—the nineteenth century Dublin microscopists and their work." The Irish Naturalists' Journal'' (2017): 110-115.

 
 
 
 

19th-century Irish people
Irish people in rail transport